Perea is a Spanish language locational surname, which originally meant a person from one of the various places called Perea in Spain. The name may refer to:

Alberto Perea (born 1990), Spanish footballer 
Brayan Perea (born 1993), Colombian footballer
Édgar Perea (born 1940), Colombian politician
Edixon Perea (born 1984), Colombian footballer
Emmanuel Perea (born 1985), Argentine footballer
Enrique Perea Quintanilla (1956–2006), Mexican journalist
Esteban de Perea (died 1639), Spanish missionary 
Fran Perea (born 1978), Spanish actor and singer
Francisco Perea (1830–1913), American politician
Gabby Perea (born 2002), American artistic gymnast
Henry Perea (born 1977), American politician
Ítalo Perea (born 1993), Ecuadorian boxer
José Emilio Perea (born 1983), Mexican boxer
Jose Luis León Perea (born 1947), Mexican politician
Juan José Perea (born 2000), Colombian footballer
Julia Pérez Montes de Oca (1839-1875), Cuban poet
Luis Alberto Perea (born 1986), Colombian footballer 
Luis Amaranto Perea (born 1979), Colombian footballer
Luis Carlos Perea (born 1963), Colombian footballer
Nicolás Perea (born 1992), Colombian footballer 
Nixon Perea (born 1973), Colombian footballer
Patricia Díaz Perea (born 1984), Spanish athlete
Pedro Perea (1852–1906), American politician
Robert L. Perea (born 1953), American writer
Sebastián Pozas Perea (1876–1946), Spanish general

References

Spanish-language surnames